The Amazing Race Australia is an Australian adventure reality game show based on the international Amazing Race franchise. Following the premise of other versions of the format, the show follows teams of two as they race around the world. Each season is split into legs, with teams tasked to deduce clues, navigate themselves in foreign areas, interact with locals, perform physical and mental challenges, and travel by air, boat, car, taxi, and other modes of transport. Teams are progressively eliminated at the end of most legs for being the last to arrive at designated Pit Stops. The first team to arrive at the Finish Line wins a grand prize of A$250,000.

The series was first aired on the Seven Network, who purchased the format rights to produce an Australian version in 2010 and (as of 2020) hold the Australian broadcast rights to the American version. The first two editions of the show aired in 2011 and 2012 were produced by activeTV, which also produced the Asian and Israeli versions of The Amazing Race, in association with ABC Studios. Following a hiatus in 2013, a third season titled The Amazing Race Australia v New Zealand, which included New Zealand teams, aired in 2014 and was produced in-house by the network's own Seven Productions. The show aired in New Zealand on TV2. The host for Seven's iteration the show was actor Grant Bowler. Seven's iteration of the show was not renewed for a fourth season.

In June 2019, it was announced the series would be revived by Network 10. 10's iteration of the show is produced by Eureka Productions and hosted by former rugby league footballer Beau Ryan. The first edition of 10's iteration, and the fourth season overall, aired in late 2019. 10's second and the fifth season overall aired in 2021 and was set in Australia, following international travel restrictions due to the COVID-19 pandemic. 10's third and the sixth season overall aired in 2022 and returned to the regular global travel format. As of 30 January 2023, the series has not been renewed nor has it been cancelled.

The Race
The Amazing Race Australia is a reality television competition between teams of two in a race around the world. Each season is divided into a number of legs wherein teams travel and complete various tasks to obtain clues to help them progress to a Pit Stop where teams are given a chance to rest and recover before starting the next leg. The first team to arrive at a Pit Stop is often awarded a small prize while the last team is normally eliminated (except in non-elimination legs, where the last team to arrive may be penalised in the following leg). The final leg is run by the last three remaining teams, and the first to arrive at the final destination wins the 250,000 cash prize.

Teams

Each team is composed of two individuals who have some type of relationship to each other. A total of 86 participants have joined The Amazing Race Australia.

Route Markers

Route Markers are yellow and red flags that mark the places where teams must go. Most Route Markers are attached to the boxes that contain clue envelopes, but some may mark the place where the teams must go in order to complete tasks, or may be used to line a course that the teams must follow.

Route markers were, however, coloured yellow and green in the second leg of the inaugural season to avoid confusion with the flag of South Vietnam. The route markers were not changed for a visit to Vietnam during the 4th season.

Clues

Clues are found throughout the competition in sealed envelopes, normally inside clue boxes. They give teams the information they need and tasks they need to do in order for them to progress.

Route Info: A general clue that may include a task to be completed by the team before they can receive their next clue.
Detour: A choice between two tasks. Teams are free to choose either task or swap tasks if they find one option too difficult.
Roadblock: A task only one team member can complete. Teams must choose which member will complete the task based on a brief clue about the task before fully revealing the details of the task.
Fast Forward: A task that only one team may complete, allowing that team to skip all remaining tasks and head directly for the next Pit Stop. Teams may only claim one Fast Forward during the entire season.

Obstacles

During the race, teams may face the following which may potentially slow them down:
Intersection: When encountered, two teams have to mutually agree to team up and complete tasks together until they receive a clue indicating that they are no longer Intersected.
Yield: At this obstacle, which was only seen in series two to date, one team can force another trailing team to wait a pre-determined amount of time before they could continue racing.
U-Turn: At this obstacle located after a Detour, one team can force another trailing team to return and complete the other option of the Detour they did not select. 
In series 2, the "U-Turn Vote" was introduced, having all teams voting at the start of the leg for whom they wish to receive the U-turn. The team with the most votes would be U-Turned sometime during the leg. 
Also, an "Anonymous U-Turn" is where a team may U-Turn another trailing team without having to reveal themselves.
Stowaway Teams: Introduced on the 5th season, random intervals, new teams would be introduced to the race at the start of the leg.
T-Junction is similar to an Intersection, but with all remaining teams split up into two larger super-teams together for the rest of the leg. The first team to arrive at the T-Junction would create both super-teams. The second super-team to arrive at the Pit Stop would then have to choose one team from the group to eliminate. The T-Junction was intended to be introduced in the 5th season.

Legs
At the beginning of each leg, teams receive an allowance of cash, typically in Australian dollars, to cover expenses during the competition (except for the purchase of airline tickets, which are paid for by credit cards provided by the show).

Teams then have to follow clues and Route Markers that will lead them to the various destinations and tasks they will face. Modes of travel between these destinations include commercial and chartered aeroplanes, boats, trains, taxis, buses, and rented vehicles provided by the show, or the teams may simply travel by foot. Each leg ends with a twelve-hour Pit Stop where teams are able to rest and where teams that arrives last are progressively eliminated until only three teams remain. Most legs comprise three or more challenges, often a Roadblock, Detour and a Route Info task. The first teams to arrive at the Pit Stop win prizes, usually from the show's sponsors.

Gameplay Prizes
Occasionally, the first arriving team will win an advantage in the game. 
 The Express Pass: Introduced in season 1, the pass allows the holders to skip any task they want. 
 The Australia v New Zealand edition introduced a twist to the Express Pass, where the team that won the first leg won one pass for themselves and a second for another team.
 The Salvage Pass: Introduced in season 2, The pass allows that team to either save the last team to arrive the current leg from elimination or gain a 1-hour time credit for the next leg.
 The First Class Pass: Introduced in the 5th season, the pass allows the holder to skip the entire next leg of the race, during which they will enjoy a special reward experience. The pass is awarded to the first placing team on a non-elimination leg. Additionally, the holder will allocate a The Salvage and The Sabotage to the Bottom Two teams (see non-elimination legs).

Non-elimination legs
Each season has a number of predetermined non-elimination legs, in which the last team to arrive at the Pit Stop is not eliminated and is allowed to continue on the competition. However, that team is penalised for the next leg

Marked for Elimination: On seasons 1 and 2, the penalised teams were tasked to arrive first to the next Pit-Stop, or otherwise face an automatically 30-minute time penalty upon arrival at that Pit Stop.
Speed Bump: Two iterations of the Speed Bump exist on the Australian version 
 On season 3, the Speed Bump was an additional task that the penalised team must complete before they receive their clue and continue racing. This resembles the Speed Bump used on most seasons of most versions of the show. 
 On season 4, the Speed Bump added an additional aspect to the first task of the following leg, making it more difficult for the penalised team. This version of the Speed Bump resembled the Handicap penalty used on The Amazing Race Norge. This Speed Bump variation was also used on the 27th American season in that season's sole Speed Bump. This iteration of the Speed Bump returned in season 6 as the penalty for teams returning from COVID isolation. 
 On season 5, the leg winners will delegate two between the bottom two teams a Salvage (to assist the team), and a Sabotage (to penalise the team).
 The Salvage is an advantage given to the receiving team to help them on the next leg. For example, the team may receive a personal driver for the next leg, they may get extra money, or they may be allowed to know the full details of the Roadblock challenge is before they choose who attempts it.
 The Sabotage is a penalty given to the receiving team. For example, the team may need to complete the leg with one of the team members blindfolded or tied together, they may lose all their money, or they may even have to do it barefoot.
 On season 6, there was no non-elimination penalty.

Marathon legs
Marathon legs occur when teams are instructed to go to the next Pit Stop but actually must continue racing without a mandatory rest period. The clue to the Pit Stop says "Grant/Beau Awaits" with no mention of elimination. It occurred once every season for Seven's iteration of the series. This was later brought into Network 10's second season.

Rules and Penalties

Rules
For the 1st season, both team members are to perform a maximum of 6 Roadblocks. It is assumed that a similar rule was used for season 2 but there were several Roadblocks that went unaired. The slightly shorter 3rd edition featured the rule with a 5-5 Roadblock split with the 11th and final Roadblock being open to either teammate. The 4th season did not feature such Roadblock rule.
Unless otherwise stated, such as during Roadblocks, team members must stay within 6 meters of each other and stay close to their assigned camera and sound crew.

Penalties
Most penalties are adapted from the American version but sometimes the show will use its own rules. The rules may vary between seasons of the show. Given the large difference in rules between the original network 7 iterations (seasons 1–3) and the Network 10 iteration (season 4–present), the rules for both iterations are listed separately.

 First Iteration
If a team fails to complete a Roadblock, Detour or Speed Bump they receive a 4-hour penalty. 
If a team fails to complete an Intersection task, they receive a 2- or 4-hour penalty. This occurred to Anastasia & Chris and Sam & Renee of the 2011 edition. It is not stated but assumed that the larger penalty is given to the team that elects to quit with the smaller penalty was given to the team forced to quit due to their intersected team quitting.
If a team hitchhikes or travels in privately owned vehicles, they receive a 20-minute penalty. This occurred to Sam & Renae and Tyler & Nathan of season 1. 
If a team fails to take a particular type of transport or travel class, they receive a 10-minute penalty (which is a 30-minute penalty in the American version). This occurred to Jeff & Luke of season 1 who travelled on a second-class train carriage when told to travel on a third-class carriage.
If a team sells their own items in order to raise money, they receive a 30-minute penalty (which is a two-hour penalty in the American version). This occurred to Adam & Dane of season 2.
If a team pulls another team's belongings out of their taxi, they receive a 2-hour penalty. This occurred to Joseph & Grace on season 2.

 Second Iteration
If a team, in a leg where they're required to drive themselves, goes over a speed limit, they will occur a one-hour penalty. This occurred to Sid & Ash on season 4. The equivalent penalty on the American show is 30 minutes and any time deemed to have been gained from the speeding.
If a team fails to complete a task, they receive a 30-minute penalty. This occurred to Jobelle & Rani and Dwes & Katherine season 5. 
If a team hitchhikes or travels in privately owned vehicles, they receive a 10-minute penalty in season 5.

Series overview
The first season premiered in May 2011 and ended in August 2011. The second season premiered in May 2012 and ended in August 2012. The casting for a third season began in August 2012, however, it was notably absent when the network revealed its 2013 schedule in October. A 2013 edition of the show was replaced by an unsuccessful revival of The Mole. A new edition was launched in August 2014, involving teams from New Zealand and titled The Amazing Race Australia v New Zealand.

In May 2019, a casting call for a new "Adventure Travel Competition" led to speculation that The Amazing Race Australia was being revived. At the time, the only information known about the series was that it would be produced by Eureka Productions and that, like the Australia v New Zealand edition, applications were open to Australian and New Zealand citizens and permanent residents. In late May, it was reported by blog TVBlackbox that the casting call was indeed for an Amazing Race Australia revival with Network 10 commissioning the reboot. In late June, Network 10 announced the revival of The Amazing Race Australia with a new season set to air in late 2019.

Notes

Broadcast Details & Ratings

Notes

Countries and locales visited

, The Amazing Race Australia has visited 37 countries and all 6 inhabited continents.

Most routes in The Amazing Race Australia travelled across the globe, starting from one Australian location  and ending in another. There are several exceptions:
Season four began in Seoul, South Korea.
season five travelled entirely within Australia, due to travel restrictions resulting from the COVID-19 pandemic, 
Season six started in bi-cities of Sydney and Melbourne within two sections of groups of 10 teams, once all groups completed in separate legs, they were joined on the third leg in Morocco.

Oceania

North America

South America

Europe

Africa

Asia

Australia
The following list visits by the show to each Australian State and Territory.

Continent counts
The first season of The Amazing Race Australia visited four continents in total (three excluding Australia). Season two extended the racecourse to North America, and season three was the first time in South America as well as a visit to Oceania outside Australia. The Amazing Race Australia has yet to visit  Antarctica. 

Notes

Awards and nominations

References

External links
 
 
 

Australia
Seven Network original programming
Network 10 original programming
2011 Australian television series debuts
2014 Australian television series endings
2019 Australian television series debuts
2010s Australian reality television series
English-language television shows
International Emmy Award for Best Non-Scripted Entertainment winners
Television series by Seven Productions
Television series by Eureka
Australian television series revived after cancellation
Australian television series based on American television series
Television shows set in Africa
Television shows set in Asia
Television shows set in Europe
Television shows set in North America
Television shows set in Oceania
Television shows set in South America
Television productions suspended due to the COVID-19 pandemic
2020s Australian reality television series